The Filth is the first album by the noted British blues band, Sonny Black's Blues Band, fronted by songwriter, guitarist and singer Bill Boazman. It was recorded over the period of 1983 to 1987 and released by Boazman as a private pressing, sold at gigs. Boazman was formerly a solo artist and had performed with Heron.

Track listing

Side 1

"Blues Is Here To Stay"      
"Don't Touch Me"
"Jookin'" (recorded live at Dingwalls, Camden Lock, summer 1987)
"Last Night"   
"Talk To Me, Baby"
"Function" (not listed on sleeve - recorded live at the Boar's Head, Wickham, summer 1987)

Side 2

"The Filth"
"After All These Years"
"Sidetracked"
"The Thrill Is Gone"
"Bring It On Home"
"Woodcray Rag"

Personnel
Bill Boazman - vocals, lead and slide guitar
Dave Bispham - drums
Dick Jones - bass
Paul Swinton - vocal, harmonica, guitar
Maggie Jarvis - organ
Ian Smith - bass
Frank Sidebottom - piano

Production
Production: Terry Dobney
Editing: Simon Mayor
Mastering: "The Producers", Camden Town

Studio tracks

Sound engineer: Nick Horne at Woodcray Studios, Wokingham, 1983 to 1986
Mixing: "Deaf Boy" Fuller

Live tracks

Recording: Andy Hyland
Mixing: Andy Hyland

References

1987 albums